Elachista galatheae is a moth in the family Elachistidae. It was described by Viette in 1954. It is found on Campbell Island and the Antipodes Islands.

References

galatheae
Moths of New Zealand
Antipodes Islands
Fauna of the Campbell Islands
Moths described in 1954